Zapp VI: Back by Popular Demand is the sixth studio album by Ohio P-Funk band Zapp and the first album released after the death of the band in 1999.

Track listing

References

2002 albums
Zapp (band) albums